The Progressive Liberal Party (abbreviated PLP) is a populist and social liberal party in the Bahamas. Philip Davis is the leader of the party.

History
The PLP was founded in 1953 by William Cartwright, Cyril Stevenson, and Henry Milton Taylor. The PLP was the first national political party in the Bahamas.

The party governed for 25 straight years from 1967 to 1992, as well as from 2002 to 2007 and 2012 to 2017. Leading the party to its first victory in 1967 was Lynden Pindling, the country's first Prime Minister.

Perry Christie was Prime Minister of the Bahamas between 2 May 2002 and the 2007 general elections when the party was defeated by the rival Free National Movement (FNM) which won 23 seats. The FNM installed leader Hubert Ingraham as the Prime Minister. After defeat and one of its MPs leaving the party since, the PLP held 17 of the 41 seats in the Bahamas National Assembly.

In the 2012 general election, the Progressive Liberals won a solid majority in a landslide election victory, taking 29 of the 38 seats in parliament. Christie was sworn into office on 8 May 2012.

Hubert Ingraham announced his retirement from politics following the defeat of his party.

In September 2021, the PLP defeated the ruling FNM in a snap election, as the economy struggled to recover from its deepest crash since at least 1971. Progressive Liberal Party (PLP) won 32 of the 39 seats in the House of Assembly. Free National Movement (FNM) took the remaining seats. On 17 September 2021, the chairman of the Progressive Liberal Party (PLP) Philip Davis was sworn in as the new Prime Minister of Bahamas to succeed Hubert Minnis.

Electoral results

References

External links

Political parties in the Bahamas
Liberal parties in North America
Social liberal parties
Political parties established in 1953
1953 establishments in the Bahamas